The Olympic torch relay is the ceremonial relaying of the Olympic flame from Olympia, Greece, to the site of an Olympic Games. It was invented by the Nazis and was first performed at the 1936 Summer Olympics in Berlin, as a way for Hitler to spread Nazi influence to other countries and to highlight the Aryan connections of Germany to Greece. It has taken place prior to every Games since.

Although in the past some Olympic organizing committees organized torch relays which encompassed multiple countries, the International Olympic Committee now restricts international relays due to the protests during the 2008 Summer Olympics torch relay, in which the relay was met with protests at several international sites on its way to Beijing, China.

Summer Olympic Games

Winter Olympic Games

Youth Summer Olympic Games

Youth Winter Olympic Games

See also
 List of people who have lit the Olympic cauldron

References

External links
Factsheet - The Olympic Torch Relay, Olympic.org, International Olympic Committee
Golden glow for London 2012 torch, BBC News

Torch Relays
 
German inventions of the Nazi period
Olympic
Olympic flame
1936 in Germany